John Hart Brewer (March 29, 1844 – December 21, 1900) was an American Republican Party politician who represented New Jersey's 2nd congressional district in the United States House of Representatives from 1881 to 1885. Brewer was the great-great-great grandson of John Hart, a signer of the United States Declaration of Independence.

Born in Hunterdon County, New Jersey, Brewer attended Lawrenceville School and Trenton Academy, and graduated from the Delaware Literary Institute, Franklin, New York, in 1862.
He moved to Trenton, New Jersey, in 1865 and engaged in the manufacture of pottery.
He served as member of the New Jersey General Assembly in 1876.
He served as president of the National Potters' Association in 1879.

Brewer was elected as a Republican to the Forty-seventh and Forty-eighth Congresses, serving in office from March 4, 1881 to March 3, 1885.

After leaving Congress, he resumed the manufacture of pottery until 1895, when he engaged in the insurance business. He was appointed assistant appraiser of merchandise at the port of New York City by President McKinley and served until his death in Trenton, New Jersey, December 21, 1900. He was interred in Riverview Cemetery in Trenton.

References

John Hart Brewer at The Political Graveyard

1844 births
1900 deaths
People from Hunterdon County, New Jersey
Republican Party members of the United States House of Representatives from New Jersey
Republican Party members of the New Jersey General Assembly
Politicians from Trenton, New Jersey
19th-century American politicians